William Ayling (30 September 1766 – October 1826) was an English cricketer who played in 22 first-class cricket matches between 1800 and 1810.

Ayling was born in 1766 at Cocking in Sussex, the son of Robert and Mary Ayling. He was a shoemaker and moved to Bromley in Kent in the early years of the 19th century. He made his first-class debut for an England XI against a Surrey side in August 1800 at Lord's Old Ground and went on to play for a variety of sides, most frequently in first-class matches for England sides. He played for the Players in the first two Gentlemen v Players matches in 1806 and made one appearance in a first-class match for a Kent XI against an England side at Bowman's Lodge in 1806.

Playing more frequently for Kent sides in non-first-class matches, including in odds matches, Ayling is known to have played cricket until 1815, playing for club sides including Woolwich Cricket Club and Prince's Plain Club. His batting technique was unusual. He held the bat in one hand until just prior to hitting the ball and stood square on to the bowler.

Ayling died at Bromley in October 1826. It is possible that he was the brother of the Robert Ayling who played two first-class matches for Kent in 1796.

Notes

References

External links

1766 births
1826 deaths
English cricketers
English cricketers of 1787 to 1825
Kent cricketers
Players cricketers
People from Cocking, West Sussex
People from Bromley
T. Mellish's XI cricketers
Non-international England cricketers